Dhu Loch (also known as "Loch Dhu") is an impounding reservoir, located 1 kilometre directly west of the much larger Loch Fad and 5 kilometres south west of Rothesay. The loch is part of the water supply system for the town. The earthen dam is 8.1 metres high and was completed in 1905.

See also
 List of reservoirs and dams in the United Kingdom

Sources
"Argyll and Bute Council Reservoirs Act 1975 Public Register"

Reservoirs in Argyll and Bute